Emil Johannes Hünten (19 January 1827 – 1 February 1902) was a German military painter. His works were often lithographed.

Biography
Born in Paris on 19 January 1827, the son of the composer, Franz Hünten, he studied art under Hippolyte Flandrin and Horace Vernet at the Ecole des Beaux Arts. In 1848, he moved to Antwerp to work in the studios of Gustaf Wappers and Josephus Laurentius Dyckmans, before heading to Düsseldorf in 1851 where his teachers were Julius Lessing and Wilhelm Camphausen.

With such influences, it is not surprising that the artist began to paint historical scenes from the life of Frederick the Great, and gradually turned to military subjects. His work appealed to Crown Prince Frederick William of Prussia who invited him to accompany the army on the campaign in Schleswig-Holstein in 1864. Two years later, Hünten was attached to the Prussian forces in the Austro-Prussian War, and four year later, he covered the Franco-Prussian War.

Among his customers were many famous people. Otto von Bismarck ordered a scene from the Battle of Gravelotte. He won medals for his works at Berlin (1872) and Vienna (1873), and became a member of the Berlin Academy in 1878. He excelled also as a painter of horses. One of his students was the English historical/military artist, Ernest Crofts.

Theodor Fontane was inspired by the Work of Emil Hünten for his novel Wanderungen durch die Mark Brandenburg. In his novel Effi Briest the protagonists visit Hüntens great panorama Battle of St. Privat in Berlin.

He died at Düsseldorf on 1 February 1902.

Paintings

In Germany works by Emil Hünten are on display at the Palast Kunst Museum Düsseldorf, Kunsthalle Kiel (owns al least two works), Deutsches Historisches Museum Berlin, the Lower Saxony State Museum in Hanover and the Bismarck Museum in Friedrichsruh.

 Prussian Cuirassiers dashing over a Bridge (1852–53)
 Skirmish near Hennersdorf (1855)
 Skirmish at Reichenbach (1856)
 Battle of Zorndorf (1858)
 Prince Ferdinand of Brunswick during the Battle of Krefeld, 23 June 1758 (1860)
 From the time of Frederick the Great
 Assault on the Düppel Redoubts (1865)
 Prussia Hussars against Danish Dragoons
 Patrol of Cuirassiers
 General von Nostitz at Oeversee
 Austrian Officer with Flag of Truce
 Reconnoitring at Sadowa
 Skirmish of Patrol near Thorstedt
 Struggle with French Cavalry at Elsasshausen, 6 August 1870 (1877)
 Fall Manoeuvres on the Rhine (1879)
 Battle near Loigny, 2 December 1870 (1882)
 Two Parforce riders (1883)
 Charge of the Cuirassiers at Worth
 The 53rd at Colombey
 Charge of Hussars at Hebecourt
 Guard-Dragoons at Battle of Mars-la-Tour
 The 39th Fusilier-regiment at Gravelotte
 At the Battle of Vionville, 16 August 1870
 The Hessians at St. Privat
 The search
 Chasseurs d'Afrique at Sedan
 The meeting of Bismark and Napoleon after Sedan

Further reading
 Obituary, The Athenaeum, 1902, page 218.
 Bryan's Dictionary of Painters and Engravers. London: G. Bell and Sons, 1921. Vol III, pp. 306–307.

External links

 Museum Kunst Palast, Düsseldorf (website), which owns 24 notebooks by Hünten, including more than 1000 sketches.

1827 births
1902 deaths
19th-century German painters
19th-century German male artists
German male painters
German war artists
19th-century war artists